Sir Richard Bulkeley (1524 – 1572 or 1573) was a Welsh politician. He was the eldest son of Sir Richard Bulkeley, of Beaumaris, Chamberlain of North Wales (in 1534), and his wife Catherine daughter of Sir William Griffith, Knight, of Penrhyn Castle, co. Caernarfon and his wife Jane Stradling.

He was knighted at Berwick-upon-Tweed in 1547 by John Dudley, 1st Earl of Warwick and Lieutenant of the King's Army in Scotland. He was appointed High Sheriff of Anglesey in 1547, 1552 and 1561, and High Sheriff of Caernarvonshire in 1550 and 1558. and Custos Rotulorum of Anglesey bef. 1558–1572. As the leading citizen of Beaumaris he did everything possible to advance the town's interests, and obtained a charter for its incorporation from Elizabeth I in 1562. His eldest son became the first Mayor of Beaumaris the following year.

He was the Member of Parliament for Anglesey in 1549–1552, April to May 1554, Nov 1554 to Jan 1555, and in 1571–1572.

He married twice: firstly Margaret, daughter of Sir John Savage of Rock Savage, Cheshire, and Lady Elizabeth Somerset (daughter of Charles Somerset, 1st Earl of Worcester), and secondly Agnes, eldest daughter of Thomas Needham of Shenton. His eldest son Richard was also an MP and his youngest son Lancelot was Archbishop of Dublin from 1619 to 1650. He died in 1573; his second wife, who had been unfaithful to him, was accused by his eldest son of having poisoned him. She was convicted of adultery by an ecclesiastical court but a local jury acquitted her of murder.

References

1524 births
1570s deaths
16th-century Welsh politicians
High Sheriffs of Anglesey
High Sheriffs of Caernarvonshire
Members of the Parliament of England (pre-1707) for constituencies in Wales
Welsh knights
Richard
English MPs 1547–1552
English MPs 1554
English MPs 1554–1555
English MPs 1571
People from Beaumaris